WQDI-LD, virtual channel 20 (UHF digital channel 21), is a low-powered television station licensed to Canton, Ohio, United States and serving Northeastern Ohio. The station is owned by DTV America Corporation. All of WQDI's channels are duplicated on sister station KONV-LD (virtual channel 28, UHF digital channel 23).

History 
The Federal Communications Commission issued the station's initial construction permit for W21DI-D on May 17, 2011. The current WQDI-LD call sign was adopted on December 4, 2015. The station signed on the air on May 31, 2016 as an Estrella TV affiliate on its main channel only one or two months after sister station WEKA-LD signed on.

In April 2017, Cheddar started broadcasting over the air with DTV America affiliating five stations including WQDI with the network. Dunkin' Donuts, a Cheddar advertiser, was handing out free digital antennas at events in the stations' markets to publicize the over the air launch.

On December 31, 2022, Azteca America ceased operations.

Digital channels
The station's digital signal is multiplexed:

References

External links
 
 

Estrella TV affiliates
Comet (TV network) affiliates
Stadium (sports network) affiliates
Decades (TV network) affiliates
Low-power television stations in the United States
Innovate Corp.
Television channels and stations established in 2016
QDI-LD